Paul Warner Powell (April 13, 1978 – March 18, 2010) was an American man convicted and executed for the murder of his friend Stacie Reed, 16, in 1999. He also raped, strangled, and stabbed the girl's sister Kristie, 14, who survived. Following the vacature of his capital murder conviction upon appeal, he wrote letters boasting about his crimes under the mistaken belief that he was exempt from punishment by the principle of double jeopardy. His letters were used as evidence against him in a second trial that resulted in his execution in 2010.

History
On January 29, 1999 in Manassas, Virginia, 20-year-old Powell killed his 16-year-old friend, Stacie Reed. He first attempted to rape her after learning Stacie's current boyfriend was African-American; Powell was "a self-avowed racist and white supremacist" who objected to interracial relationships. After Stacie fought him off, he stabbed her in the chest, puncturing her heart. Powell then drank iced tea and smoked, while waiting for Kristie, Stacie's 14-year-old sister, to come home from school. When she arrived, Powell ordered her to the basement and raped her. Interrupted by someone at the front door, he dressed and tied the girl up. While he was gone, Kristie untied her hand and tried unsuccessfully to hide or escape. Powell returned to the basement, removed Kristie's eyeglasses, and strangled her until she was unconscious. He stabbed her in the stomach, and the knife stopped within a centimeter of her aorta. He slashed her in her neck numerous times; the wounds later required 61 sutures. She had multiple stab wounds to her neck and abdomen as well as wounds on her wrists. Her stepfather, Robert Culver, arrived home at 4:15 p.m. He found Stacie's body then searched the house for the phone to call police. He then found Kristie bleeding in the basement. She ultimately survived — with the scars on her neck serving as visible evidence of the brutal attack. She testified against Powell at his trial.

Legal proceedings and claim of double jeopardy
Powell was convicted of capital murder and sentenced to death, but the verdict was thrown out on appeal by the Virginia Supreme Court. The court decided that there was insufficient evidence to prove that Powell attempted to rape Stacie and that there were no other aggravating factors that would warrant a death sentence: the fact that Kristie had been raped could not serve as a basis for making Stacie's killing a capital murder. The conviction for the rape of Kristie Reed was upheld, and Powell was given three life sentences. 

Powell, believing that he no longer faced the death penalty because of double jeopardy, then wrote an abusive letter to the prosecutor and admitted that he attempted to rape Stacie and boasted about his crimes in detail, among several other taunting or threatening letters he sent to the victims' family. The letter to the prosecutor read, in part: "Since I have already been indicted on first degree murder and the Va. Supreme Court said that I can't be charged with capital murder again, I figured I would tell you the rest of what happened on Jan. 29, 1999 to show you how stupid all of y'all . . . are". He detailed how he told Stacie she could "do it the easy way or the hard way" and how she continued to resist him. He then stabbed her and stomped on her neck until she stopped breathing. "I guess I forgot to mention these events when I was being questioned. Ha Ha! ... Do you just hate yourself for being so stupid and for [messing] up and saving me?"

In fact, the principle of double jeopardy did not apply, since although his capital murder verdict had been vacated, he had not been acquitted of the criminal charge, and was still eligible to be retried for first degree murder. Using the letter that Powell wrote, prosecutors indicted Powell again for the rape and murder of Stacie Reed. Powell was once again convicted, and was sentenced to death.

Execution
Powell chose to be executed by the electric chair instead of lethal injection. He made no final statement, however, the day before his death, he spoke to Reed's family by phone and acknowledged the crime "was a senseless and pointless thing" and said he was sorry. He was executed on March 18, 2010. Powell was the second-to-last person to die in Virginia's electric chair.

See also
 Capital punishment in Virginia
 Capital punishment in the United States
 List of people executed in Virginia
 List of people executed in the United States in 2010

References

1978 births
2010 deaths
21st-century executions by Virginia
21st-century executions of American people
American people convicted of murder
American murderers of children
American rapists
People convicted of murder by Virginia
People executed for murder
People executed by Virginia by electric chair